Julián de la Herrería (3 May 1888, Asunción – 11 July 1937, Valencia) was a Paraguayan painter, engraver, and ceramicist. His birth name was Andrés Campos Cervera., but he signed his work Julián de la Herrería.

External links

1888 births
1937 deaths
People from Asunción
Paraguayan people of Spanish descent
Paraguayan artists